Capitites ramulosa is a species of tephritid or fruit flies in the genus Capitites of the family Tephritidae.

Distribution
Europe, North Africa, Syria, Israel, Canary Islands.

References

Tephritinae
Insects described in 1844
Diptera of Europe
Diptera of Africa